Abantis efulensis is a butterfly in the  family Hesperiidae. It is found in Cameroon, the Republic of the Congo, the Democratic Republic of the Congo and Uganda (from the south-west to the Kigezi District).

References

Butterflies described in 1896
Tagiadini
Butterflies of Africa